The fluffy-backed tit-babbler (Macronus ptilosus) (Thai: นกกินแมลงหลังฟู) is a species of bird in the family Timaliidae.
It is found in Brunei, Indonesia, Malaysia, and Thailand.
Its natural habitats are subtropical or tropical moist lowland forest and subtropical or tropical swampland.
It is threatened by habitat loss.

There are two subspecies recognized by the International Ornithological Congress:

 M. p. ptilosus Jardine & Selby, 1835 - Malay Peninsula, Sumatra, Batu Islands
 M. p. trichorrhos (Temminck, 1836) - Bangka Belitung Islands and Borneo

References 

Collar, N. J. & Robson, C. 2007. Family Timaliidae (Babblers)  pp. 70–291 in; del Hoyo, J., Elliott, A. & Christie, D.A. eds. Handbook of the Birds of the World, Vol. 12. Picathartes to Tits and Chickadees. Lynx Edicions, Barcelona.

fluffy-backed tit-babbler
Birds of Malesia
fluffy-backed tit-babbler
fluffy-backed tit-babbler
fluffy-backed tit-babbler
Taxonomy articles created by Polbot